Andrew Wylie (born August 19, 1994) is an American football offensive tackle for the Washington Commanders of the National Football League (NFL). He played college football at Eastern Michigan and joined the NFL as an undrafted free agent in 2017.

College career
Wylie made 44 starts for the Eastern Michigan Eagles over the course of four seasons. He was named third-team All-MAC his senior season.

Professional career

Indianapolis Colts
Wylie signed with the Indianapolis Colts as an undrafted free agent on May 15, 2017. He was released during final cuts on September 2, 2017 and was signed to the Colts' practice squad two days later. He was released by the Colts on September 26, 2017.

Cleveland Browns
Wylie was then signed to the Cleveland Browns practice squad on October 9, 2017 but was released on December 15.

Los Angeles Chargers
Wylie was signed to the Los Angeles Chargers practice squad on December 19, 2017 but was released eight days later.

Kansas City Chiefs
Wylie signed with the Kansas City Chiefs the next day and was promoted to the active roster on January 8, 2018. He made his NFL debut on September 9, 2018 in the season opener against the Los Angeles Chargers. Wylie made his first career start on October 21, 2018 against the Cincinnati Bengals. Wylie played in all 16 games during the regular season and started the final ten games of the season after Laurent Duvernay-Tardif went down with a season-ending injury. At the end of the season the Chiefs gave Wylie the 2018 Mack Lee Hill Award as the team's best first-year player.

Wylie started 11 games for the Chiefs in 2019, missing five games due to injury. Wylie suffered a high ankle sprain that caused him to miss the final two games of the regular season and all of the Chiefs' playoff games, including the team's win in Super Bowl LIV over the San Francisco 49ers.

Wylie signed a one-year exclusive-rights free agent contract with the Chiefs on April 20, 2020. He started 14 games at right guard during the regular season. He missed the third game of the season due to a severe stomach illness and was rested for the final game of the regular season. Wylie started the Chiefs' first two games of the postseason at right guard, but was shifted to right tackle for Kansas City's loss to the Tampa Bay Buccaneers in Super Bowl LV after starting tackle Eric Fisher tore his achilles in the AFC Championship Game.

The Chiefs placed a restricted free agent tender on Wylie on March 17, 2021. He signed the one-year contract on May 11. He started seven games at right tackle in 2021.

On March 17, 2022, Wylie re-signed with the Chiefs. Wylie started Super Bowl LVII and was part of an offensive line that gave up zero sacks against a vaunted Eagles defense, as the Chiefs won the game 38-35.

Washington Commanders
Wylie signed a three-year, $24 million contract with the Washington Commanders on March 16, 2023.

References

External links
Washington Commanders bio
Eastern Michigan Eagles bio

1994 births
Living people
Players of American football from Michigan
Sportspeople from Midland, Michigan
American football offensive tackles
Eastern Michigan Eagles football players
Indianapolis Colts players
Cleveland Browns players
Los Angeles Chargers players
Kansas City Chiefs players
Washington Commanders players